Amen Ogbongbemiga (pronounced AY-men awg-BONG-beh-MEE-guh; born September 4, 1998) is a Nigerian gridiron football linebacker for the Los Angeles Chargers of the National Football League (NFL). He played college football at Oklahoma State.

Early life and high school career
Amen Ogbongbemiga was born on September 4, 1998, in Lagos, Nigeria. His family moved to Houston, Texas, in 2003 and to Calgary in 2011. He went to high school at Notre Dame in Calgary before moving back to the United States. In his junior year of high school he recorded 104 tackles, three sacks, 13 tackles for loss, four forced fumbles, and two recoveries. Ogbongbemiga amassed 110 tackles, 15 for loss, four sacks, five forced fumbles and three recoveries. He was named first-team all-district and team MVP his senior year. He helped his team achieve 37 consecutive victories, near the all-time Canadian record. He was thrice an Academic Honor Roll selection. He also competed in track & field at Notre Dame.

College career
He attended college at Oklahoma State University from 2016 to 2021. He sat out his true freshman season as a redshirt.

He was named first-team academic all-Big 12 after his freshman season, posting 16 tackles and 13 solo stops while playing in 12 games. His best game came against Pittsburgh, where he recorded a season-high five tackles. He was credited with tackles for loss in games against South Alabama and Baylor. He also was credited with one quarterback hurry during the season

Ogbongbemiga played in all 13 games as a sophomore, logging 12 tackles, three for loss, 1.5 sacks, and a fumble recovery. Against rival Oklahoma he recorded a sack of Kyler Murray, and a season-high three tackles. He matched that statistic against South Alabama as well. He was named team captain during both the Oklahoma, and South Alabama games. He had an important blocked punt in an Oklahoma State win over Boise State. He also led all Oklahoma State special teams players with six tackles. He was awarded the OSU Outstanding Special Teams Player award as well as named first-team academic all-Big 12 following the season.

He was voted team captain for the 2019 season and performed well, finishing the season ranked sixth in the Big 12 with 100 tackles. He led the team with 15.5 tackles for loss and 5 sacks. Against Texas A&M, he recorded a season-high 12 tackles, also amassing a sack and fumble recovery in the annual Texas Bowl. He also recorded his first career interception late in a win over Iowa State. In games against Texas and West Virginia he recorded 11 tackles, also recording 10 in a game against Oregon State. He was team captain in games against Oklahoma, Baylor, and Tulsa. He ended the season gaining Second-team All-Big 12 and First-team Academic All-Big 12 honors, as well as the Leslie O'Neal award, for the best defensive player on the team.

He remained the team captain for his senior season, leading OSU in tackles in six of its eleven games. He was a semifinalist for the Lott IMPACT Trophy, an honorable mention for defensive player of the year, a First-team All-Academic selection for the fourth straight year, and a Second-team All-Big 12 selection for the second consecutive year. He started every game and was the game captain in games against Kansas, Oklahoma, Baylor, and Miami. He finished the season with 81 tackles, only one shy of their 2020 leader Malcolm Rodriguez. He led the Cowboys in tackles in the games against West Virginia (13), Kansas (5), Texas (10), Kansas State (8), Texas Tech (11), and TCU (12). His 13 tackles against West Virginia were a career-high. He also recorded 2.5 sacks and three quarterback hurries during the season. In the game against TCU, he had three forced fumbles in under 19 minutes, only one shy of the NCAA's single game recovery record. He was named Big 12 Player of the Week following the game. He chose to forgo remaining eligibility and instead declare for the NFL Draft.

Professional career

After going unselected in the 2021 NFL Draft, Ogbongbemiga signed as an undrafted free agent with the Los Angeles Chargers. Three days later, he was selected with the 8th overall pick in the 2021 CFL Draft by the Calgary Stampeders. He made the final roster as a rookie and appeared in 15 games, recording 26 tackles.

Personal life
His brother, Alex, played in the Canadian Football League (CFL).

References

External links

Oklahoma State Cowboys football bio
Los Angeles Chargers bio

1998 births
Living people
Oklahoma State Cowboys football players
Los Angeles Chargers players
American football linebackers
Sportspeople from Lagos
Players of American football from Houston
Nigerian players of American football
Nigerian emigrants to the United States